The Palisadoes Foundation is a non-profit organization based in Cupertino, California, US, founded in 2016 
by members of the Jamaican diaspora and The Jamaica Diaspora Technology Taskforce to promote the use of information technology in Jamaica.

Activities
The Palisadoes Foundation participates in a number of activities in accordance with its mandate to support STEM education in Jamaica.

The Calico Challenge
In 2016 the Palisadoes Foundation began the Calico Challenge, 
a program where software engineering students in Jamaican universities are awarded an internship to work on open-source software projects over the summer under the guidance of an industry mentor. Students are paid a stipend based on the achievement of predefined goals. Sponsors have included the JPS Foundation.

The Palisadoes Foundation also works closely with the Jamaica Computer Society in promoting and managing the Calico Challenge in Jamaica.

Open Source Repository
The Palisadoes Foundation's GitHub repository stores the open source software that is created and modified by its volunteers and student interns.

Equipment Donations
In 2018, the Palisadoes Foundation donated computer server equipment to the University of the West Indies, Mona, Jamaica and the University of Technology, Jamaica.

References

External links
 Palisadoes Foundation's GitHub repository
 The JPS Foundation
 University of Technology, Jamaica IEEE student branch
 UWI Mona Computing Society

2016 establishments in California
Charities based in California
Scientific organizations established in 2016